American General Media is a media company specializing in radio.  It was founded by Lawrence Brandon and is operated by sons Anthony and Rogers.  American General Media is headquartered in Bakersfield, California.

Lawrence Brandon owned and operated over 75 radio stations during his tenure; today the company operates stations throughout the Southwest.

Markets and stations

Albuquerque/Santa Fe
KABG in Los Alamos, New Mexico
KHFM in Santa Fe, New Mexico
KIOT in Los Lunas, New Mexico
KJFA in Belen, New Mexico
KJFA-FM in Pecos, New Mexico
KKRG in Santa Fe, New Mexico
KKSS in Santa Fe, New Mexico
KLVO in Belen, New Mexico

Bakersfield, California
KEBT in Lost Hills, California
KERN in Wasco-Greenacres, California
KISV in Bakersfield, California
KGEO in Bakersfield, California
KGFM in Bakersfield, California
KKXX in Shafter, California
K241CI in Bakersfield, California
K266CG in Bakersfield, California

Cortez, Colorado
KRTZ in Cortez, Colorado
KVFC in Cortez, Colorado
K222AD in Cortez, Colorado

Durango, Colorado
KDGO in Durango, Colorado
KKDG in Durango, Colorado
KPTE in Bayfield, Colorado
K252FJ in Durango, Colorado

Farmington, New Mexico
KENN in Farmington, New Mexico
KISZ in Cortez, Colorado
KPRT in Kirtland, New Mexico
KRWN in Farmington, New Mexico
K221DJ in Farmington, New Mexico
K257DQ in Farmington, New Mexico

San Luis Obispo
KKAL in Paso Robles, California
KKJG in San Luis Obispo, California
KSTT in Atascadero, California
KVEC in San Luis Obispo, California
KZOZ in San Luis Obispo, California

Santa Maria
KBOX in Lompoc, California
KPAT in Santa Maria, California
KRQK in Lompoc, California
KSMA in Santa Maria, California
KSNI in Santa Maria, California

Fines
In April 1999, American General Media, licensee of Station KISV(FM), Bakersfield, CA received a Notice of Apparent Liability from the Federal Communications Commission "for a Forfeiture pursuant to Section 503(b) of the Communications Act of 1934."    

American General was fined $4,000 for the willful violation of Section 73.1206 of the Federal Communications Commission's rules - the unauthorized broadcast of a telephone conversation.   

A second notice and fine of $3,000 was sent to American General in September 1999 for Station KISV(FM) repeated violations of Section 73.1206.

References

External links
American General Media Santa Maria Facebook
American General Media Home Page

Privately held companies based in California
Companies based in Bakersfield, California
Radio broadcasting companies of the United States
Companies with year of establishment missing